Tagiades samborana is a butterfly in the family Hesperiidae. It is found on Madagascar and the Comoro Islands. The habitat consists of forests.

Subspecies
Tagiades samborana samborana (Madagascar)
Tagiades samborana rana Evans, 1937 (Comoro Islands: Anjouan)

References

Butterflies described in 1891
Tagiades
Butterflies of Africa